Joonas Alanne (born December 5, 1990) is a Finnish ice hockey player. He is currently playing with the Asia League Ice Hockey team the Nikko Ice Bucks. Alanne formerly played for the Lahti Pelicans in the Finnish Liiga.

Alanne made his Liiga debut playing with Lahti Pelicans during the 2013–14 Liiga season.

References

External links

1990 births
Living people
Finnish ice hockey forwards
Lahti Pelicans players
Nikkō Ice Bucks players
People from Rovaniemi
Sportspeople from Lapland (Finland)